Ridgeway is an unincorporated community in Warren County, North Carolina, United States. Ridgeway has a post office with ZIP code 27570.

The Chapel of the Good Shepherd and William J. Hawkins House are listed on the National Register of Historic Places.

References

Unincorporated communities in Warren County, North Carolina
Unincorporated communities in North Carolina